The 1995 Davis Cup (also known as the 1995 Davis Cup by NEC for sponsorship purposes) was the 84th edition of the Davis Cup, the most important tournament between national teams in men's tennis. 115 teams entered the competition, 16 in the World Group, 25 in the Americas Zone, 29 in the Asia/Oceania Zone, and 45 in the Europe/Africa Zone. Bermuda, Ethiopia, Kazakhstan, Macedonia, Moldova and Pacific Oceania made their first appearances in the tournament.

The United States defeated Russia in the final, held at the Olympic Stadium in Moscow, Russia, on 1–3 December, to win their 31st title overall.

World Group

Draw

Final
Russia vs. United States

World Group Qualifying Round

Date: 22–24 September

The eight losing teams in the World Group first round ties and eight winners of the Zonal Group I final round ties competed in the World Group Qualifying Round for spots in the 1996 World Group.

Americas Zone

Group I

Group II

Group III
 Venue: Santo Domingo Tennis Club, Santo Domingo, Dominican Republic
 Date: 1–5 March

Group A

Group B

  and  promoted to Group II in 1996.

Asia/Oceania Zone

Group I

Group II

Group III
 Venue: Dubai Creek Golf & Yacht Club, Dubai, United Arab Emirates
 Date: 10–16 April

Group A

Group B

  and  promoted to Group II in 1996.

Europe/Africa Zone

Group I

Group II

Group III

Zone A
 Venue: Centro Tennis Cassa di Risparmio, San Marino, San Marino
 Date: 10–14 May

Group A

Group B

  and  promoted to Group II in 1996.

Zone B
 Venue: Tennis Club de Brazzaville, Brazzaville, Congo
 Date: 26–30 April

Group A

Group B

  and  promoted to Group II in 1996.

References
General

Specific

External links
Davis Cup Official Website

 
Davis Cups by year
Davis Cup
Davis Cup